Miss Monte-Cristo is a 2021 South Korean television series starring Lee So-yeon, Choi Yeo-jin, Kyung Sung-hwan and Lee Sang-bo. The series, directed by Park Ki-ho and written by Jeong Hye-won, revolves around Go Eun-jo (Lee So-yeon) a fashion designer. She vows revenge on all those friends who bring her downfall. The drama is loosely based on the famous French novel The Count of Monte Cristo by Alexandre Dumas hence the title.

The daily drama premiered on KBS2 on February 15, 2021 and aired every weekday at 19:50 (KST) till July 2.

Synopsis
Go Eun-jo (Lee So-yeon) is a fashion designer. She wants to make people around her happy, but her friends betray her and she loses everything. She swears revenge on all those responsible for her downfall. After 5 years she comes back as Hwang Ga-heun the daughter of Hong Kong's investor Jin Hwang to take revenge like The Count of Monte Cristo. Hence the title Miss Monte-Cristo.

Cast

Main
 Lee So-yeon as Go Eun-jo/Hwang Ga-heun (Huang Jiaxin)
 30 years old, fashion designer, called the 'sell out queen' of Dongdaemun, head of the Jaewang Fashion design manager, Seon-hyeok's lover, Ha-ra, Se-rin and Bo-mi's friend. She falls into death because of a conspiracy of her friends. After 5 years she comes back as Hwang Ga-heun the daughter of Hong Kong's investor Hwang Ji-na to take revenge. In the end, she lost all her memories due to trauma after witnessing Hara’s suicide in the bridge and continues to live happily with her family.
 Choi Yeo-jin as Oh Ha-ra
 30 years old, Ha-joon's step-sister, an actress, possessive and obsessive. She conspires to win her unrequited love for Cha Seon-hyeok. She is evil to the core as she killed Eun-Jo’s baby and father. In the end, she can’t hide her crimes anymore and committed suicide in the same bridge where she pushed Eun-jo five years ago.
 Kyung Sung-hwan as Cha Seon-hyeok
 34 years old, Eun-jo's first love, Bo-mi's brother, Cho-sim's son, director of Jaewang Group strategy planning. He was about to marry Eun-jo when she fell victim to a conspiracy.
 Lee Sang-bo as Oh Ha-joon
 34 years old, Ha-ra's stepbrother, executive managing director of Jaewang Group, an all around multi-entertainer.

Supporting
 People around Go Eun-jo
 Jung Seung-ho as Go Sang-man
 62 years old, Eun-jo's father, owner of Goeun Shopping Complex.
 Kim Mi-ra as Bae Soon-jeong
 58 years old, Eun-jo's mother.
 Han Gi-yoon as Go Eun-gyeol
 24 years old, Eun-jo's brother, mentally  7 years old, adores his sister.
 Oh Mi-hee as Hwang Ji-na/Hwang Cheon-gil
 58 years old, the late Ga-heun's mother, CEO of White Fund, Eun-jo's godmother.
 Lee Yan as Wang Toong-jo
 40 years old, Ji-na's assistant, exponent of various martial arts. In the end, he surrenders himself to the authorities for killing Wook-do.
 People around Oh Ha-ra
 Lee Da-hae as Joo Se-rin
 30 years old, Tae-sik's daughter, Eun-jo's hometown friend, the leading designer of Miss Joo Collection, a woman of passion and dreams of success by all means, full of envy and greed, responsible for Eun-jo's death. In the end, she learns that Eun-jo is DDM Queen and the one who killed her dad, Joo Tae-sik, she can’t accept that her father was the one who paid for her sins and become mentally ill. She tried to commit suicide but failed and was admitted to a mental hospital. 
 Lee Hwang-eui as Oh Byeong-gook
 65 years old, Ha-joon and Ha-ra's father, chairman of Jaewang Group, his first wife Seong Na-yeon passed away and now married to her friend Eun-hwa. It was revealed that he knows that Eun-hwa killed Na-yeon and was using her to boost his power and wealth. He also ordered Wook-do to assassinate Hwang Ji-na, in the end he was arrested for his crimes.
 Kim Kyung-sook as Geum Eun-hwa
 58 years old, Byeong-gook's second wife, vice-president of Jaewang Group, Ha-ra's mother and Ha-joon's evil and greedy stepmother. In the end, she was arrested for murdering Na-yeon, embezzlement and conspiring to kill Hwang Ji-na.
 Sunwoo Yong-nyeo as Han Yeong-ae
 85 years old, the godmother of Jaewang Group, the late Na-yeon's mother-in-law, strong and wise woman.
 Jang Sun-yool as Cha Hoon
 5 years old, Seon-hyeok and Ha-ra's son, kind, pretty and warm-hearted.
People around Cha Seon-hyeok
 Lee Mi-young as Yoon Cho-sim
 58 years old, Seon-hyeok and Bo-mi's mother, Ha-ra's mother-in-law, Eun-hwa and the late Na-yeon's high school friend.
 Lee Hye-ran as Cha Bo-mi
 30 years old, Seon-hyeok's sister, Cho-sim's daughter, a make-up artist, Seon-hyeok's sister, Ha-ra's sister-in-law, Eun-jo's bestie, very loyal.
Others
 Kwon Oh-hyeon as Joo Tae-sik
 65 years old, Se-rin's father, CEO of Jupiter Shopping Mall, a bluff, liar and fraud, Sang-man's hometown friend. In the end, Eun-jo and Deok-gyu killed him by triggering his heart attack.
 Ahn Hee-sung as Na Wook-do
 35 years old, Jupiter Shopping Mall head of department, has criminal records. In the end, he was killed by Toong-jo.
 Kim Ae-ran as Park Bong-sook
 52 years old, the Jaewang family housekeeper since Na-yeon was around, now she is Eun-hwa's subordinate. She is the only witness to Na-yeon's death.
 Seo Ji-won as Shin Deok-gyu/Choi Young-seok
 28 years old, son of Jung-pil, joins Eun-jo with her revenge against Tae-sik, who caused the death of his father. In the end, he surrenders himself for killing Tae-sik so that Eun-jo can continue her revenge. 
 Hyun Seung-ho as Secretary Park
 Secretary of Oh Byeong-gook.
 Jung Hwi-wook as Kim Kang-ho
 Secretary of Geum Eun-hwa.
 Lee Ye-eun as Seong Na-yeon
 Ha-joon's mother, Byeong-gook's first wife, Eun-hwa's friend. It was revealed that Eun-hwa killed her.
 Kim Doo-eun as Shin Jung-pil
 Deok-gyu's deceased father, owner of Jackpot Clothes, friend of Sang-man and Tae-sik.
 Yang Bom-yi as Hwang Ga-heun
 The real Hwang Ga-heun, deceased daughter of Hwang Ji-na.
 Sung Chan-ho as Chairman Tak
 A kingmaker who exerts influence in the business world.

Production

Casting
On November 6, 2020, it was announced that Lee So-yeon will star in the daily drama, returning to TV after one and half year. Later in November Choi Yeo-jin joined as another lead in the cast as rival of Lee So-yeon's character in drama. In December 2020, Lee Hye-ran and Lee Da-hae joined the cast as friends of the protagonist played by Lee So-yeon. Kyung Sung-hwan and Lee Sang Bo also joined the cast as the male protagonists in December.

Original soundtrack

Miss Monte-Cristo: Original Soundtrack 
The following is the official track list of Miss Monte-Cristo: Original Soundtrack album, which was released by Blending Co., Ltd on June 30, 2021.

Singles 
The following is the track list of singles from Miss Monte-Cristo: Original Soundtrack.

Part 1

Part 2

Part 3

Part 4

Part 5

Part 6

Part 7

Part 8

Part 9

Part 10

Part 11

Viewership

Awards and nominations

Notes

References

External links
  
 
 
 Miss Monte-Cristo at Daum 
 Miss Monte-Cristo at Naver 
 Miss Monte-Cristo on Viki 

Korean Broadcasting System television dramas
2021 South Korean television series debuts
2021 South Korean television series endings
Korean-language television shows
South Korean melodrama television series
Television series about revenge